Belgium has participated in the biennial classical music competition Eurovision Young Musicians 11 times since its debut in 1986, most recently taking part in 2022. The country's best result is two second-place finishes, in 1990 and 1992; two of only three years in which the country has qualified for the televised final (the other being 2022, which was a one-night-only televised final). Belgium hosted the contest in 1992.

Participation overview

Hostings

See also
Belgium in the Eurovision Song Contest
Belgium in the Junior Eurovision Song Contest

References

External links 
 Eurovision Young Musicians

Countries in the Eurovision Young Musicians